John Carewe (born 24 January 1933) is a British conductor. Very early in his student career at the Guildhall School of Music, Carewe gave up his original intention of being a composer and turned to conducting. His teachers, nevertheless, were all composers: Walter Goehr and Max Deutsch (both Schoenberg pupils), Messiaen (with whom he studied in Paris on a French Government scholarship) and Pierre Boulez. In 1958 he founded the New Music Ensemble and gave many British premieres of music by composers including Birtwistle, Boulez, Bennett, Maxwell Davies, and appeared at most of the major British festivals, including the BBC Proms. He was one of the three conductors in the first British performance of Stockhausen’s Gruppen, given in Glasgow in 1960.

In 1966 Carewe was invited by Sir William Glock to become the Principal Conductor of the BBC Welsh Orchestra. From 1974 to 1986 Carewe was music director of the Brighton Philharmonic Society, and was Principal Conductor of The Fires of London between 1980 and 1984.

In 1988 Carewe gave the world premiere of Elliott Carter’s Oboe Concerto with Heinz Holliger. In 1996 he was involved with Sir Simon Rattle and Daniel Harding in six performances of Gruppen in Birmingham, London and Vienna.

In 1993 Carewe accepted an appointment as General Music Director of the Chemnitz Opera, and the Robert-Schumann-Philharmonic.

Carewe is also a teacher, and his pupils include Sir Simon Rattle. He frequently worked with the Bundes Jugend Orchester and taught conducting at both the Royal Academy of Music and the Royal College of Music in London. He has served on the jury of the Gustav Mahler Conducting Competition.

Among Carewe's recordings are Debussy's Pelléas et Mélisande (recorded in 1988 after performances at Nice Opera), and Milhaud's La Création du Monde and Stravinsky's The Soldier's Tale (recorded with a chamber ensemble from the London Symphony Orchestra).

Carewe has two daughters: Mary, a vocalist and Anna, a celloist.

References 

British male conductors (music)
1933 births
BBC Orchestras
Alumni of the Guildhall School of Music and Drama
Living people
21st-century British conductors (music)
21st-century British male musicians